The 1928 Tour of Flanders was held in 1928.

General classification

Final general classification

References
Résultats sur siteducyclisme.net
Résultats sur cyclebase.nl

External links
  

Tour of Flanders
1928 in road cycling
1928 in Belgian sport